Room and a Half (Russian: Полторы комнаты, или сентиментальное путешествие на родину) is a 2009 Russian biographical film. It won three Nika Awards, including Best Film, Best Director (Khrzhanovsky) and Best Screenplay. It also received the Best Film award in the East of the West section at the Karlovy Vary International Film Festival.

Plot
The film is a fictionalized account of writer Joseph Brodsky.  Much of the action incorporates animation to create an ethereal feeling. Director Khrzhanovsky stated The Nose or the Conspiracy of Mavericks is a sequel to the Room and a Half. A third sequel is planned that will unite all the films into a future trilogy.

Cast
 Alisa Freindlich as Mother
 Sergei Yursky as Father
 Grigoriy Dityatkovsky as Joseph Brodsky

References

External links
 

2009 films
Biographical films about writers
Russian biographical films